Alfredo Gutiérrez Ortiz Mena is a Mexican lawyer and Supreme Court Justice. He was born in Cuernavaca, Morelos, on October 14, 1969.

Studies 
Justice Gutiérrez Ortiz Mena earned his law degree at the National Autonomous University of Mexico (UNAM) and his graduate degree, LL.M. and International Tax Certificate from Harvard University.  As a graduate student, he was awarded a scholarship from the Fulbright-García Robles Foundation.

Professional Activities 
Between 1995 and 2012, Gutiérrez Ortiz Mena worked for different Mexican and international law firms. Afterwards, he served in the Finance and Revenue areas of the Mexican Government. 

Gutiérrez is a distinguished Harvard alumni speaker in conversational conference cycles with the academic community (Traphagen Distinguished Alumni Speaker Series). 

Since 2016, Justice Gutiérrez acted as an environmental Good Will Ambassador for the Americas at the Organization of American States. He is also a member of the Board of Directors of the Global Judicial Institute on the Environment.

He is currently a member of the Board of Directors of the National Autonomous University of Mexico Endowment. He is a member of both the Mexican and New York State Bar Associations.

Justice of the Supreme Court of Mexico
In November 2012, Gutiérrez Ortiz Mena was nominated to fill a vacancy on the Supreme Court of Mexico. His appointment was approved by the Mexican Senate. He was sworn in on December 1, 2012, for a term of fifteen years. 

In his opinions and dissents, Justice Gutiérrez Ortiz Mena has recurrently explained why his approach to law is guided by the notion that the Constitution should be read and interpreted in accordance with international human rights law. His legal reasoning often relies on the language of principles that would seem associated with liberal values. He has subscribed the idea that rules limiting the scope of human rights provisions should be interpreted in the most restrictive way possible. 

Justice Gutiérrez Ortiz Mena has consistently argued in favor of analyzing cases through a “gender lens”. His thinking on equality and discrimination has led him to vote in favor of striking down statutory rules that, in his view, would likely reinforce stereotypes. According to one of his opinions, in any decision making process, judges should follow certain analytical steps in order to maintain awareness of the structural inequalities that may be at play. He has also voted in favor of understanding that the Constitution does not discriminate on the basis of sexual orientation. 

He has favored the interpreting role of the court in cases involving claims of arbitrary detentions, torture, coerced confessions, and abuse of force by police, among others.

In some of his opinions, he has dealt with issues like the standard of adequate representations at trail, the right to confront witnesses, and suggestive eyewitness identification procedures.

He has also advocated a case which upholds the need to analyze (in “Amparo” proceedings) accusations of torture brought by the Codefendants of the Defendant.

Justice Gutiérrez has argued for a ruling which confirms the obligation of the authority to guarantee a person’s right not to be a victim of enforced disappearance in accordance with the Urgent Actions issued by the United Nations Committee on Enforced Disappearances. 

In those cases involving constitutional infringements matters 148/2017, 106/2018 (and its single file merger 107/2018) he has concurred (together with the rest of the members of the Court sitting in Full) in favor of women and pregnant individuals to decide on interruption of pregnancy and the invalidity of any criminal statute which punishes such a decision.

On federalism, Justice Gutiérrez Ortiz Mena has issued opinions and dissents expressing belief in the importance of granting meaningful leeway to State authorities.

In matters of administrative law, he has shown willingness to afford deference to the statutory interpretation proposed by administrative agencies.

Along with other Justices, Alfredo Gutiérrez Ortiz Mena has argued that the Mexican Supreme Court should use a more discretionary method to select the cases it hears. His position favors the courts ability to use its judicial discretion to set the agenda of constitutional interpretation.

References 

Living people
1969 births
Mexican judges
Mexican jurists
People from Cuernavaca
Harvard Law School alumni
National Autonomous University of Mexico alumni
Supreme Court of Justice of the Nation justices